Hussain Imam was a prominent politician of Bihar. He was a member of the Constituent Assembly of India in 1946.
One of the key members of the Pakistan Muslim league, Hussain imam played a key role in Pakistan's foundation. One of Jinnah's closest friends, Hussain Imam played an influential role in Pakistani politics using his wealth and remained an affluent figure of the Pakistan movement.

Hussain Imam was first elected to Gaya Municipal Committee in 1928. Shortly after that, he became a member of the viceroy's Council of State in 1930. He was soon taken into the Working Committee of the All Parties' Muslim Conference under the presidency of The Aga Khan.

When Muhammad Ali Jinnah reorganized the All India Muslim League, Hussain Imam was picked by him as one of the members of both the bodies: the Working Committee and the Central Parliamentary Board. His political enthusiasm for a separate Muslim state continued until the creation of Pakistan. He had been always closely associated with the Quaid-i-Azam. He hosted the Quaid in Gaya.

The Simla Conference of 1945 was a meeting between the Viceroy of India Lord Wavell and the major political leaders of British India at the Viceregal Lodge in Simla. Hussain Imam attended the Simla Conference along with Quaid-i-Azam Muhammad Ali Jinnah in June 1945.

Hussain Imam held two remarkable positions in his political career: president of the Bihar Muslim League, and chairman, viceroy's Council of State. In the Legislature, he was nominated to one of the Retrenchment Committees of government of India in 1931 and continued to be nominated to various committees throughout his twenty-one years in Indian Legislation up to August 1951. The most important of these committees were: Imperial Council of Agricultural Research 1938 to 1945, Textile Control Board, 1943 to 1948, the Indian Pay Commission, 1946 to 1947, and the Indian Company Law Committee. November 1950 to September 1951. He migrated to Pakistan in September 1951.

References

Sources

Year of birth missing
Year of death missing
Members of the Constituent Assembly of India
Members of the Council of State (India)